Quang Vinh may refer to several entity in Vietnam, including:

Place
Quang Vinh, Biên Hòa, a ward of Biên Hòa

Person
Quang Vinh (singer), a singer
Bùi Quang Vinh, former Minister of Planning and Investment of Vietnam